Thai fruit carving is a traditional Thai art that requires neatness, precision, meditation, and personal ability. Fruit carving persisted in Thailand as a respected art for centuries. It was originally used only to decorate the tables of the royal family. Fruit carving is a popular custom practiced during Songkran.

History
Carving fruits and vegetables was a skill taught to women in the Thai royal palace.

One (now known to be apocryphal) legend holds that sometime before the Sukhothai era (Thai era from 1808-1824), a concubine named either Nang Nopphamat (Thai Peerage) or Thao Srichulalak (another name of Thai peerage) wrote a book entitled Tamrap Thao Srichulaluk. The book discusses traditional Thai ceremonies, including the floating lantern festival called Phraratchaphithi Chongpriang Nai Wanphen Duean Sipsong. Its protagonist wants to decorate a lantern more beautifully than other concubines, so she uses many kinds of flowers to decorate her lantern. Then she carved fruits into bird and swan  shapes and placed them on the flower petals.

Tools
Carvers use only one knife to carve fruit. Knives come in many varieties.

Types of fruit
Many types of fruits are used for carving. The two basic types are thick fruit and thin.

See also
Fruit carving
Mukimono
Vegetable carving

References

External links 

 Thai Carving.

Thai cuisine
Thai art